Michael Collins (born 6 December 1958) is a South African cricketer. He played in five first-class matches for Eastern Province in 1979/80.

See also
 List of Eastern Province representative cricketers

References

External links
 

1958 births
Living people
South African cricketers
Eastern Province cricketers
Cricketers from Pretoria